Guidolin is a surname. Notable people with the surname include:

Aldo Guidolin, Canadian ice hockey coach
Bep Guidolin, Canadian ice hockey player
Francesco Guidolin, Italian soccer coach
Luciano Guidolin (born 1972), Brazilian businessman, CEO of Odebrecht
Rodrigo Guidolin, Brazilian tennis player